Haute-Savoie (Arpitan: Savouè d'Amont or Hiôta-Savouè; 'Upper Savoy') is a department in the Auvergne-Rhône-Alpes region of Southeastern France, bordering both Switzerland and Italy. Its prefecture is Annecy. To the north is Lake Geneva; to the south and southeast are Mont Blanc and the Aravis mountain range.

It holds its name from the Savoy historical region, as does the department of Savoie, located south of Haute-Savoie. In 2019, it had a population of 826,094. Its subprefectures are Bonneville, Saint-Julien-en-Genevois and Thonon-les-Bains. The French entrance to the Mont Blanc Tunnel into Italy is in Haute-Savoie. It is noted for winter sports; the first Winter Olympic Games were held at Chamonix in 1924.

History 

The historical region of Savoy was governed by the House of Savoy, the ruling dynasty of Savoy from 1032 to 1860. The Duchy of Savoy were rulers of the Savoy region from 1416 to 1720.

The territory occupied by modern Haute-Savoie and the adjoining department of Savoie became part of the Kingdom of Sardinia after the Treaty of Utrecht in 1713. Annexation of the region by France was formalised in the Treaty of Turin on March 24, 1860.

From November 1942 to September 1943, Haute-Savoie was subjected to military occupation by Fascist Italy. The Maquis des Glières (a band of Free French Resistance fighters who opposed the Nazi, Vichy and Milice regimes during World War II) operated from Haute-Savoie. In the winter of 1943–1944, German troops burned down around 500 farms in response to French Resistance activities.

Politics

Departmental Council of Haute-Savoie

The Departmental Council of Haute-Savoie has 34 seats. As of 2020, fifteen councillors are part of the Haute-Savoie Union group (miscellaneous right), fourteen are part of the Avenir Haute-Savoie group (The Republicans) and five are part of the Union du Centre group (The Centrists). Martial Saddier had been President of the Departmental Council since 2021.

Representation in Paris

National Assembly
Haute-Savoie elected the following members of the National Assembly in the 2017 legislative election:

Senate

Haute-Savoie sends three Senators to Parliament. Loïc Hervé and Cyril Pellevat were both elected in 2014; Sylviane Noël took office in 2018.

Geography 

Haute-Savoie comprises four arrondissements, divided into 279 communes and 17 cantons. To the north, it borders the Swiss canton of Geneva and Lake Geneva; to the east the Swiss canton of Valais and Italy's Aosta Valley; to the west the French department of Ain; and to the south the department of Savoie.

Some of the world's best-known ski resorts are in Haute-Savoie.

The terrain of the department includes the Alpine Mont Blanc range; the French Prealps of the Aravis Range, the Chablais, Bornes and Bauges Alps; and the peneplains of Genevois haut-savoyard and Albanais (known collectively as L'Avant-pays savoyard). Its mountainous terrain makes mountain passes important to trade and economic life. Some of the most important are the Col de la Forclaz (which connects Chamonix to the canton of Valais) and the Mont Blanc Tunnel, linking Chamonix to Courmayeur in the Aosta Valley.

Forests
As of 1996,  of Haute-Savoie is forested (38.8 percent of the total land area), compared to 34.4 percent for the Rhone-Alpes region and 27.1 percent for France as a whole. Of the forested area  (79 percent) is managed for timber and other forest products, with the remaining  having no commercial value or used for outdoor recreation.

National nature reserves are designated by the French government as areas where an outstanding natural heritage is present in both rare and typical areas in terms of species and geology. Management is charged to local organizations, with direction and evaluation focusing on long-term protection for future generations and environmental education.
 Aiguilles Rouges National Nature Reserve – 
 Bout du Lac d'Annecy National Nature Reserve – 
 Carlaveyron National Nature Reserve – 
 Contamines-Montjoie National Nature Reserve – 
 Delta de la Dranse National Nature Reserve – 
 Passy National Nature Reserve – 
 Roc de Chère National Nature Reserve – 
 Sixt-Passy National Nature Reserve – 
 Vallon de Bérard National Nature Reserve –

Lakes

Haute-Savoie has significant freshwater resources. Lake Annecy is a major attraction, along with the town of Évian-les-Bains, perhaps the best-known town on the French shore of Lake Geneva, and known worldwide for its Evian mineral water. Haute-Savoie is entirely within the watershed of the Rhone.

Demographics 
Population development since 1861:

Principal towns

The most populous commune is Annecy, the prefecture. As of 2019, there are 7 communes with more than 15,000 inhabitants:

Education and research 

The research sector in Haute-Savoie filed 201 patents in 2000. It is represented by:
 Laboratory for Particle Physics in Annecy-le-Vieux
 Technology Center Engineering Industries (CETIM)
 Research laboratories related to Polytech Savoie, ESIA and Savoy University
 Technical center for screw-machining industry (CTDEC) in Cluses
 The Thésame - mechatronics and management

Economy

Agriculture 

There were 4,450 farmers in 1999, 4,800 farmers and over 1,700 full-time farm employees at the end of 2006. In 1999, crop production was valued at €71.5 million  and animal production at €165.4 million.

Dairy production is a large part of the Haute-Savoie economy, earning €117.2 million in 2006 and representing 74 percent of the net animal-product worth. Cattle earned €29.7 million. Cheese production (by variety) in 1999 (except as noted) was:
 Reblochon – 16,950 tons
 Tomme de Savoie – 5,500 tons
 Emmental – 3,000 tons (2006); 4,050 tons in 1999
 Raclette raw milk – 2,000 tons
 Abondance – 700 tons
 Tome des Bauges – 650 tons

Crafts 
In late 2000 crafts occupied 15 percent of the workforce, or 28,443 employees and 1,922 apprentices. The 11,951 companies represented on the Répertoire des Métiers (Trade Index) were divided into:
 Food: 955 companies
 Construction: 4,924
 Production: 2,834
 Services: 3,238

Construction and public works 
In late December 2000, building construction and public works included 13,867 employees in 4,838 companies as follows:
 Construction: 20 percent
 Decoration, electricity, plastering, painting: 70 percent
 Public works: 10 percent

Trade 
In late December 2000, the trade sector accounted for 33,994 employees in 9,351 companies as follows:
 Tourism, culture and recreation: 23.7 percent
 Food and restaurants: 22.5 percent
 Hygiene and health: 15.2 percent
 Service: 14.3 percent
 Cars, motorcycles, bicycles: 13.1 percent
 Household equipment, home appliances: 11.2 percent

Retail
 13 hypermarkets
 92 supermarkets
 24 maxidiscounts
 6 department and variety stores
 465 other stores

From 1998 to 2005, 65 new supermarkets were built for an area totaling .
The average expenditure per capita in 2006 was €21,706. With the 2004–2007 rise of the euro, Swiss customer traffic decreased five or six percent (Swiss shoppers make up half the shoppers in the Genève–Savoyard district).
At the end of 2006, traditional small businesses (less than ) represented 84 percent of businesses and 40 percent of retail space.

Companies
4,301 companies were established in 2004 in Haute-Savoie: nearly 80 percent in the service sector, with a high percentage offering service to individuals (hotels, restaurants, recreational, cultural, sports, personal and household services). This accounted for 21.6 percent of new businesses.
The most active sectors were real estate (up 24 percent), construction (up 15.4 percent), business services (up 12.4 percent) and the food industry (up 10 percent).

In 1999, Haute-Savoie had 2,779 industrial companies producing 13.60 percent of all business income.

Companies in Haute-Savoie 
  Food: Entremont, Evian (mineral water), Cereal Partners France, La Gerbe Savoyarde, France, Decoration, Besnier, Fruity
  Chemistry-Pharmacy-Medical: Labcatal, Nicholas Roche, Pierre Fabre Galderma, Ivoclar-Vivadent, Corneal, SNCI, Anthogyr
  Commerce: Provencia, Botanic
  Electrical and electronic: Chauvin-Arnoux, DAV, Label, Amphenol Socapex, Cartier, Varilac CEB
  Mechanical equipment: Dassault, adixen Vacuum Products, Bosch Rexroth, Union Pump-Guinard Pumps (Group Textron)
  Home, household equipment: Tefal, Scaime Bourgeois, Mobalpa, Somfy
  Personal items: S.T. Dupont, Rexam Reboul, Gay, Maped, Pilot
  Data: Sopra, Cross Systems
  Machine tools and special machines: Stäubli, Prosys, Mach 1, Techmeta (Bodycote), Wirth and Gruffat, Mecasonic, Almo
  Mechanics: SNR Bearings, Parker Hannifin, Glacier Vandervell, Invensys, Eurodec, Frank and Pignard, Bouverat, Nicomatic, ZF, Sandvik, Rossignol Technology
  Metals and materials: PSB Industries, Pechiney Rhenalu, Fonlem Lachenal
  Plastics: Veka, SMPI, Decoplast
  Sport and leisure goods: Salomon (skiing), Mavic, Dynastar, Millet, Fusalp, Eider
  Other: Velsol France, Mecalac, ABMT (Bodycote)

Screw-cutting is a precision parts-machining industry, and Haute-Savoie generates the bulk of French screws. Firms engaged in screw-cutting are major employers in the department. While the automotive industry is the principal client, firms also service the electronics, household-appliance and medical sectors.

Arve Industries is part of 67 "competitiveness clusters" created in 2005.
The cluster is dedicated to mechatronics and includes 60,000 industrial jobs in over 280 companies (primarily small), 1,200 researchers and 250 patents in 2002.
Among the projects supported by the cluster is inertial tolerancing, a new approach in evaluating the quality of machined parts. Based on the Taguchi loss function, inertia is defined by its deviation from its target. Inertial tolerancing is a research-and-development program supported by the cluster for its member companies. It is led by a research team from the Symme Laboratory of the University of Savoie and the CTDEC (Centre Technique du Decolletage). The publication of the French standard NFX 04-008 demonstrates the relevance of topics covered by the cluster.

Other programs involve the production of clean parts (4P project), developing new models of customer-supplier relationships to improve the effectiveness of simultaneous engineering tasks, and development of the international visibility of the cluster and its members.
The companies concerned are involved with industrial mechanics, precision engineering, precision turning and sub-assemblies and mechanical assemblies, often associated with integrating technologies such as plastics, electronics and hydraulics.
Markets served by member companies of the cluster include transport (cars, trucks, rail and air), production and distribution of electricity, hydraulics (gas or liquid, high-pressure vacuum), medical and health-related.

Services 
In late December 2000, the service sector employed 75,768 people in 11,129 companies in:
 Hotels and restaurants – 26.5 percent
 Real estate activities – 24.6 percent
 Consulting and assistance – 14.0 percent
 Transportation – 6.1 percent
 Financial activities – 6.2 percent

Tourism 
As of late December 2000, the tourism sector had a total of 635,000 beds divided as follows:
 1,250 – Rural lodgings
 803 – Hotels
 453 – Guest rooms
 191 – Campsites
 70 – Bed-and-breakfasts
 40 – Mountain huts

In 1999 there were 37.9 million overnight stays: 56 percent in winter and 44 percent during the rest of the year.

Cross-border workers
Many people who live in Haute-Savoie (more than 52,200 in November 2006) work in Switzerland (in the cantons of Geneva, Vaud and Valais). The phenomenon has accelerated since bilateral agreements concluded between Switzerland and the European Union, of which a significant part concerned free movement of people. In 2007, commuting increased over 12%.

Effective June 1, 2007, residents of Haute-Savoie may freely work in Switzerland. The department and municipalities receive compensation ("frontier funds") allocated to municipalities in proportion to the number of border residents there. Following an agreement signed in Geneva in 1973, the Canton of Geneva transferred to Haute-Savoie 3.5 percent of total worker compensation, equivalent in December 2006 to €77.687 million.

Export
Exports are an important part of the economy; forty percent of Haute-Savoie employees work for exporting firms. Exports are primarily to Germany, the United States, Switzerland, Italy and the United Kingdom. Imports come mainly from Germany, Italy, the United Kingdom, Switzerland and the United States.

Taxation 
Haute-Savoie has property and income taxes. In 2006, 312,823 households were subject to property taxes and 27,747 were exempt.
The average income tax per household was €25,621 in 2007 (compared with the national average of €21,930).

Transport 
Haute Savoie is served by the A41 and A43 highways. Annecy is accessible from Lyon, with an estimated travel time between two and three hours in normal traffic. Since it is closer to Geneva, the new highway connects the two cities in about an hour.
Meythet Airport in Annecy  has Air France Regional round-trip service to Paris Orly.
Saint-Gervais is the only railroad station directly serving a ski resort. The main rail line serves Annecy-Annemasse-Geneva. The Annecy railway station has TGV (high speed trains) departures and arrivals to and from Paris via the high-speed line from Lyon Part-Dieu.

Sources 
 Assedic (January 2000)
 Construction 74 (January 2000)
 ERC / DDAF 1999
 Chamber of Agriculture
 Chamber of Trade (December 2000)
 Customs
 SIRENE of INSEE (July 2003)
 CTDEC
 Chamber of Commerce
 Thésame

See also

Language
 Arpitan language

Places
 Lake Annecy - The third largest lake in France.
 Lake Geneva - Lake which joins Upper Savoy and Switzerland.

Notes

References

External links

 
  Departmental Council website
  Prefecture website
  Haute-Savoie Chamber of Commerce and Industry
 Employment statistics access to regional statistics (Department of Labor Region Rhone-Alpes)
 

 
1860 establishments in France
Departments of Auvergne-Rhône-Alpes
States and territories established in 1860